Scincella forbesorum  is a species of skink. It is endemic to Mexico and is known from the state of Hidalgo.

References

Scincella
Endemic reptiles of Mexico
Reptiles described in 1937
Taxa named by Edward Harrison Taylor